The MAMA Award for Best New Male / Female Artist is an award presented by CJ E&M Pictures (Mnet) at the annual MAMA Awards. Mnet is also the one who chooses which group or individual will win this category as well as other categories in MAMA. Since 2008, nominees for this category include both groups and soloists. 

The accolade was first awarded at the 1st Mnet Asian Music Awards ceremony held in 1999; winners Lee Jung-hyun and Team received the titles "Best New Solo Artist" and "Best New Group" for their songs "Come" and "Farewell", respectively. The award is given in honor for new artist(s) with the most achievements in the music industry during the course of the year.

History

Winners and nominees

1990s

2000s

2010s

2020s

 Each year is linked to the article about the Mnet Asian Music Awards held that year.

 As members of I.O.I in 2016 and then Pristin the following year, Im Nayoung and Zhou Jieqiong have received the award twice.

 As members of IZ*ONE in 2018 and then IVE in 2021, An Yu-jin and Jang Won-young have received the award twice.

Gallery of winners

Notes

References

External links
 Mnet Asian Music Awards official website

MAMA Awards
Music awards for breakthrough artist